Valdemaras Venckaitis (born September 4, 1983 in Vilnius) is a Greco-Roman wrestler from Lithuania, who competed for the men's 74 kg (middleweight division) at the 2008 Summer Olympics in Beijing. He was eliminated in the first round of the competition, after being defeated by Peru's Sixto Barrera, and finished in fourteenth place.

Venckaitis also won the bronze medal for his category at the 2007 World Wrestling Championships in Baku, Azerbaijan. He is the brother of Edgaras Venckaitis, who later competed for the lightweight division at the 2012 Summer Olympics in London.

References

External links 
NBC 2008 Olympics profile

1983 births
Living people
Wrestlers at the 2008 Summer Olympics
Olympic wrestlers of Lithuania
Lithuanian male sport wrestlers
World Wrestling Championships medalists
21st-century Lithuanian people